This is a list of episodes for Uncle Grandpa, an American animated TV series created by Peter Browngardt and airing on Cartoon Network. The pilot episode was created in 2008 but was aired on Cartoon Network Video in 2010 as part of the show project The Cartoonstitute, while the series premiered on September 2, 2013. On July 25, 2014, the series was renewed for a second season, which premiered on March 5, 2015.

On March 30, 2016, it was reported that the series had been renewed for fourth and fifth seasons by Cartoon Network, but in a different mode: they decide to split in half the already-ordered 52 episode-long second season, rebranding the first half as "season two" and the second half as "season three." The already-ordered third season likewise was divided into the newly ordered "season four" and season five".

The series concluded on June 30, 2017 after the series finale "Uncle Grandpa: The High School Years" with 5 seasons and a total of 153 episodes.

During the course of the series, 153 episodes of the series aired over five seasons.

Series overview

Episodes

Pilot and precursors (2008–12)

Season 1 (2013–15)

Season 2 (2015)

Season 3 (2015–16)

Season 4 (2016)

Season 5 (2016–17)

Shorts

Crossover special

References

Uncle Grandpa
Uncle Grandpa
Uncle Grandpa